Lake Arrowhead or Arrowhead Lake may refer to:

United States

Bodies of water
 Arrowhead Lake (Idaho)
 Lake Arrowhead Reservoir, California
 Lake Arrowhead, Georgia
 Lake Arrowhead (Maine)

Communities
 Arrowhead Lake, Cumberland County, New Jersey
 Lake Arrowhead, California
 Lake Arrowhead, Maine
 Lake Arrowhead, Missouri
 Lake Arrowhead, Wisconsin